On June 8, a car bomb exploded in the Kurdish town of Midyat, in the southeastern Mardin Province. It happened in close proximity to Midyat's police office, drawing parallels with the June 2016 Istanbul bombing just one day prior. Five people were killed in the blast – two police officers and three civilians – with 30 others being injured. Turkish Prime Minister Binali Yildirim blamed the bombing on the PKK.

Two reporters from the US state-funded Voice of America were attacked by local residents when investigating the scene.

References

History of Mardin Province
June 2016 crimes in Asia
June 2016 events in Turkey
Kurdish–Turkish conflict (2015–present)
Mass murder in 2016
21st-century mass murder in Turkey
Terrorist incidents in Turkey in 2016
2016 murders in Turkey